Mark White (born March 11, 1950, Union City, Tennessee) is a Republican member of the Tennessee House of Representatives. He represents House District 83, which includes Germantown, Bartlett, Cordova and portions of East Memphis.

White was formerly second vice-chairman of the Shelby County Republican Party. He was the Republican nominee for U.S. Congress in Tennessee's 9th congressional district in the 2006 election. White's opponents in the general election were Democrat Steve Cohen and independent Jake Ford.  It was White's first bid for elected office. White placed third with 18 percent of the vote, well behind Cohen (60 percent) and Ford (22 percent). This was the worst showing for a Republican in the district since the 1950s.

White supported Rick Perry for Republican primary of the 2012 presidential election.

District 83
In July 2009, Tennessee State Senator Paul Stanley resigned his 31st District seat. This prompted Brian Kelsey, the then-Representative from Tennessee's 83rd State House District, to resign his post in September 2009 to run for the senate seat. A special election was triggered, with the primary to occur on December 1, the same day as the election to fill the Senate seat. Mark White won the primary in a three-candidate field, and went on to face Democrat Guthrie Castle and Independent John Andreucetti in the General Election on January 12, 2010. The final results had White leading by a very comfortable margin in the extremely low turnout election., White was elected to a full term in the seat later in 2010.

References

1950 births
Living people
Republican Party members of the Tennessee House of Representatives
People from Union City, Tennessee
Candidates in the 2006 United States elections
21st-century American politicians